The 1986 Boise State Broncos football team represented Boise State University in the 1986 NCAA Division I-AA football season. The Broncos competed in the Big Sky Conference and played their home games on campus at Bronco Stadium in Boise, Idaho. Led by fourth-year head coach Lyle Setencich, Boise State finished the season at 5–6 overall (3–4 in conference, fifth).

Prior to the season, BSU athletic director Gene Bleymaier had blue AstroTurf installed in Bronco Stadium, the first non-green field in the NCAA.

Boise State struggled with injuries and had its first losing season in four decades; shortly after the season concluded in Boise with a fifth consecutive loss in the series with rival Idaho, Setencich resigned.

Schedule

References

Boise State
Boise State Broncos football seasons
Boise State Broncos football